Jurong Hill MRT station is a future elevated Mass Rapid Transit (MRT) station on the Jurong Region line (JRL) in Boon Lay, Singapore. First announced in May 2018, the station is expected to be completed in 2029 along with Phase 3 of JRL.

History
On 9 May 2018, the Land Transport Authority (LTA) announced that Jurong Hill station would be part of the proposed Jurong Region line (JRL). The station will be constructed as part of Phase 3, consisting of 7 stations – a 4 station extension to Jurong Hill station from Boon Lay and a 3 station extension to Peng Kang Hill from Tawas. It was expected to be completed in 2028. However, the restrictions on construction due to the COVID-19 pandemic has led to delays, with the completion date pushed to 2029.

Construction is scheduled to start in the second quarter of 2021, with expected completion in 2029.

Station details
The station will serve the JRL and will be located between the Tukang and Jurong Pier stations. The official station code will be JS11. The station will span over Jurong Pier Road, at the junction with Bird Park Drive just south of the Ayer Rajah Expressway (AYE) interchange. With four entrances, the station will serve Jurong Bird Park and Jurong Hill Park to the west and surrounding industrial developments.

References

Mass Rapid Transit (Singapore) stations
Proposed railway stations in Singapore
Railway stations scheduled to open in 2029